Spergo nipponensis is a species of sea snail, a marine gastropod mollusk in the family Raphitomidae.

Description

Distribution
This marine species occurs off Japan.

References

 Okutani, T. & Iwahori, A. (1992) Noteworthy gastropods collected from bathyal zone in Tosa Bay by the R/V Kotaka-Maru in 1987 and 1988. Venus, 51, 235–268.

External links
 

nipponensis
Gastropods described in 1992